António Manuel Moreira Tânger Corrêa (born 24 April 1952) is a politician, former diplomat and sailor from Portugal.

António Tânger Corrêa is the current Vice President of the Portuguese political party Chega, by appointment of the party leader André Ventura.

Represented Portugal at the 1992 Summer Olympics in Barcelona, Spain as helmsman in the Soling. With crew members Ricardo Batista and Luis Miguel Santos where the team reached 21st place.

As Portuguese diplomat he was involved in at least two scandals that cost taxpayers thousands of euros.
António Tânger Corrêa was suspended in 2009 for 90 days due to various irregularities found in the management of the Portuguese embassy in the Lithuanian capital, Vilnius.

Antonio was Ambassador of Portugal in Doha, Qatar.

References

1952 births
Living people
Sailors at the 1992 Summer Olympics – Soling
Ambassadors of Portugal to Qatar
Portuguese diplomats
Portuguese politicians
Chega politicians